Joshua John Christopher Wakefield (born 6 November 1993) is an English footballer who plays as a midfielder for Southern League Premier South side Salisbury.

Career
Wakefield started his career in local football in Shanklin, he then moved to AFC Bournemouth and started a two-year apprenticeship in the summer of 2010. In November 2011, Wakefield joined Wimborne Town along with Billy Maybury on a one-month work experience deal. In January 2012, he was again sent out on loan, joining Hamworthy United. He made his debut for the Hammers in a 4–0 defeat to Moneyfields. In April 2012, Wakefield was offered his first professional contract, on a one-year deal. On 30 April 2012, he was drafted into first team duty, making his debut in a 1–1 draw with Scunthorpe United, coming on as a substitute for Donal McDermott in the second half.

On 18 August 2015, Wakefield joined League Two side Yeovil Town on a one-month loan deal, and made his debut that evening against York City.

On 25 February 2016, Wakefield joined League One side Walsall on loan until the end of the season.

On 24 May 2016 Wakefield was released by Bournemouth.

On 4 August 2016, Wakefield joined National League side Aldershot Town on a one-year deal.

On 21 December 2016, Wakefield was released from Aldershot Town by manager Gary Waddock at the end of his contract in January 2017.

On 23 January 2017, Wakefield signed for National League South side Poole Town.

In July 2017, Wakefield joined Southern League Premier Division club Weymouth on a one-year contract. 

After 4 seasons with the club, Wakefield left the club to join Salisbury.

Career statistics

References

External links

1993 births
Living people
English footballers
People from Newport, Isle of Wight
Association football midfielders
AFC Bournemouth players
Wimborne Town F.C. players
Hamworthy United F.C. players
Dagenham & Redbridge F.C. players
Dorchester Town F.C. players
Welling United F.C. players
Torquay United F.C. players
Bristol Rovers F.C. players
Yeovil Town F.C. players
Walsall F.C. players
Aldershot Town F.C. players
Poole Town F.C. players
Weymouth F.C. players
Salisbury F.C. players
English Football League players
National League (English football) players
Southern Football League players